Marco Zarucchi (born January 22, 1972) is a Swiss nordic combined skier who competed in his sport from 1993 to 1999. He finished seventh in the 4 x 5 km team event at the 1998 Winter Olympics in Nagano.

Zarruchi's best finish at the FIS Nordic World Ski Championships was 17th in the 7.5 km sprint event at Ramsau in 1999. His best World Cup finish was second in a 7.5 km sprint event in Austria in 1998.

Zarruchi earned four career victories, all in 1997 in 15 km individual World Cup B events.

External links

1972 births
Nordic combined skiers at the 1992 Winter Olympics
Nordic combined skiers at the 1998 Winter Olympics
Living people
Swiss male Nordic combined skiers
Olympic Nordic combined skiers of Switzerland